John Burgmeier is an American voice actor, writer and musician who works for Funimation for English dubbed anime. As a voice actor, he is best known as the voice of Kurama from Yu Yu Hakusho, Tien from the Dragon Ball series, Shigure Sohma from Fruits Basket, Eyes Rutherford from Spiral, and Switzerland from Hetalia: Axis Powers. Burgmeier is also the son of voice actress Linda Young.

Discography 

Burgmeier is also a musician and member of the rock band El Gato. He plays guitar, keyboard, and other instruments across the band's two albums and EP. While the members of El Gato are not currently active, they will still occasionally play a show.

EP 

 Everybody's a Pinata (1997)

Albums 

 We're Birds (2002)
 Surrender! (2008)

Dubbing roles

Anime

Video games

Live action dubbing

References

External links
 
 John Burgmeier at CrystalAcids English Voice Actor & Production Staff Database

Living people
American male video game actors
American male voice actors
American television writers
American male screenwriters
American male television writers
American voice directors
Year of birth missing (living people)